The Monteiro-Mor Palace (Portuguese: Palácio do Monteiro-Mor) is a Portuguese palace located in Lisbon, Portugal.

History 
Monteiro-Mor Palace is located in the Lumiar parish in Lisbon.

The name of the palace dates back to the 18th century when the High Huntsman of the Royal House (Portuguese: Monteiro-Mor) D. Henrique de Noronha and his wife D. Fernao Telles da Silva occupied the palace.

The Portuguese National Museum of Costume and Fashion is currently installed in the palace. 

The palace is surrounded by an eleven hectare botanical garden.

Sources 
Palácio do Monteiro-Mor

Palaces in Lisbon